Shai Reshef is an Israeli businessperson and academic administrator. He is the founder and president of University of the People.

Biography
Reshef earned an M.A. in Chinese Politics from the University of Michigan.

From 1989 to 2005, Reshef served as Chief Executive Officer and then Chairman of the Kidum Group, a for-profit educational services and test preparation company. In January 2009, Reshef founded the University of the People. He serves as the institution's president.

Reshef is married to painter Rotem Reshef and has four children.

References

External links

 

Living people
Israeli company founders
University of Michigan alumni
University of the People faculty
Heads of universities and colleges in the United States
Founders of universities
Israeli academic administrators
Year of birth missing (living people)
21st-century Israeli businesspeople